Michaela Hrubá (born 21 February 1998) is a Czech athlete who specializes in the high jump. She also occasionally competes in the triple jump and heptathlon.

Achievements

References

External links
 

1998 births
Living people
People from Blansko District
Czech female high jumpers
Athletes (track and field) at the 2014 Summer Youth Olympics
Athletes (track and field) at the 2016 Summer Olympics
Olympic athletes of the Czech Republic
Sportspeople from the South Moravian Region
20th-century Czech women
21st-century Czech women